Ultimate Revenge is a reality TV program about fulfilling the fantasy of anyone who wants to seek revenge on their nearest and dearest.  Elaborate practical jokes were played on family and friends instigated by their own relatives and friends. It was hosted by Ryan Seacrest. Several episodes featured radio talk show host Karel. It was shown on The New TNN from 2001 to 2003.

Ultimate Revenge premiered August 21, 2001.

References

External links
 

2000s American reality television series
2001 American television series debuts
2003 American television series endings